The 7th constituency of Réunion is a French legislative constituency on the island of Réunion. The constituency is located on the west coast. As of 2022, it is represented by Perceval Gaillard, a La France Insoumise deputy.

Deputies

Election results

2022

2018 by-election 

On July 6, 2018, the Constitutional Council declares Thierry Robert ineligible for a period of three years and the exoff of his office of deputy for failure to fulfill his tax obligations.

2017

2012

References

Sources
 French Interior Ministry results website: 

7